The 2014–15 Austrian Football Bundesliga was the 103rd season of top-tier football in Austria. FC Red Bull Salzburg won their 9th title, and second in succession.

Division
The Bundesliga is the highest division in Austrian football which took place in the 2014–15 season for the 41st time and determined the 103rd Austrian soccer champion. The main sponsor for this season, was for the first time, the sports betting company Tipico, that is why the official name changed to Tipico Bundesliga.

Lower Austria, Salzburg and Vienna each had two teams, Carinthia, Upper Austria, Styria and Vorarlberg each with one. Burgenland and Tyrol were not represented with a team in Austria's highest league. In the preseason, FC Wacker Innsbruck went down into the First League, and the SC Rheindorf Altach moved up.

The TV provider Sky Germany AG had the rights to show all Bundesliga games in full-length which were broadcast on the Sky sport Austria pay television channel. The channel broadcast all games as conference calls and  individually.  In addition, the ORF had the rights to broadcast a game of their choice, which was as a single match labeled the "top match of the round" – which usually took place  Sundays, when the midweek rounds were on Wednesdays. This was not possible though in the last two rounds where  all games had to be broadcast simultaneously. In addition, the ORF was allowed to show a 45-minute summary of the remaining four games of each round.

Mode
In the 2014/15 season, ten clubs played in 36 rounds against each other, as in previous years. Each team played twice against every other team, once at home and once away.

Due to the good European Cup results of the Austrian teams in the 2013/14 season, the ÖFB improved, placing 14th in the UEFA coefficient at the end of the season. Therefore, in the Bundesliga and Cup 2014/15 seasons teams were playing for two spots for the UEFA Champions League and three spots for the UEFA Europa League. Champion and runner up of the Bundesliga are entitled to participate in the qualifiers for the Champions League and then transfer into the third qualifying round; the third and fourth placed teams played in the qualifying for the Europa League and played in the 3rd or 2nd round. The Cup winner played in the play-offs of the Europa League. If the Cup winner qualified for the Champions League or the Europa League, by finishing in one of the top four positions of the Bundesliga, the international starting position of that season dropped and no longer went to the losers of the Cup finales but to the fifth-placed team of Bundesliga.

The last placed Bundesliga team went down into the second classed First League.

Teams

Stadia and locations

Personnel and kits

League table

Results

First half of season

Second half of season

Season statistics

Top goalscorers

Top assists

Awards

Annual awards

Player of the Year 

The Player of the Year awarded to  Jonathan Soriano 
(Red Bull Salzburg)

Top goalscorer  

The Top goalscorer of the Year awarded to  Jonathan Soriano (Red Bull Salzburg)

Goalkeeper of the Year 

The Goalkeeper of the Year awarded to  Cican Stanković 
(Grödig)

References

External links
 

Austrian Football Bundesliga seasons
Aus
1